Broken Vessels is the soundtrack album by American composer Bill Laswell, released on September 21, 1999 by Koch Records. It comprises Laswell's original score for the medical drama Broken Vessels, a film directed by Scott Ziehl released to theaters on April 18, 1998. Critic Steven McDonald called it "an engaging and propulsive recording."

Track listing

Personnel 
Adapted from the Broken Vessels liner notes.
Musicians
Lori Carson – vocals (14)
Lance Carter – drums
Bill Laswell – bass guitar, guitar, keyboards, sampler, percussion, musical arrangements, producer
Nicky Skopelitis – guitar
Technical personnel
Michael Fossenkemper – mastering
Robert Musso – engineering, mixing

Charts

Release history

References

External links 
 Broken Vessels at Bandcamp
 

1999 soundtrack albums
Bill Laswell soundtracks
Albums produced by Bill Laswell